

Charaxes richelmanni is a butterfly in the family Nymphalidae. It is found in Cameroon, Gabon, the Republic of Congo, the Central African Republic, the Democratic Republic of Congo and Tanzania. The habitat consists of lowland evergreen forests.

Description
Van Someren. 1970 describes and figures (plate 7) C. richelmanni

Subspecies
C. r. richelmanni (southern Cameroon, Gabon, Congo, Central African Republic, Democratic Republic of Congo)
C. r. scheveni Ackery, 1995.(Tanzania)

C. (richelmanni) ducarmei Plantrou, 1982 (Democratic Republic of Congo: Kivu) is now considered as bona species.[Stat.Rev.2005]

Related species
Historical attempts to assemble a cluster of presumably related species into a "Charaxes jasius Group" have not been wholly convincing. More recent taxonomic revision, corroborated by phylogenetic research, allow a more rational grouping congruent with cladistic relationships. Within a well-populated clade of 27 related species sharing a common ancestor approximately 16 mya during the Miocene, 26 are now considered together as The jasius Group.  One of the two lineages within this clade forms a robust monophyletic group of seven species sharing a common ancestor approximately 2-3 mya, i.e. during the Pliocene, and are considered as the jasius subgroup. The second lineage leads to 19 other species within the Jasius group, which are split in to three well-populated subgroups of closely related species.

The jasius Group (26 Species):

Clade 1: jasius subgroup (7 species)

Clade 2: contains the well-populated three additional subgroups (19 species) of the jasius Group: called the brutus, pollux, and eudoxus subgroups.

the eudoxus subgroup (11 species):
Charaxes eudoxus
Charaxes lucyae
Charaxes richelmanni
Charaxes musakensis
Charaxes biokensis[stat.rev.2005]
Charaxes ducarmei
Charaxes druceanus
Charaxes tectonis
Charaxes phraortes
Charaxes andranodorus
Charaxes andrefana[stat.rev.2025]

Further exploration of the phylogenetic relationships amongst existing Charaxes taxa is required to improve clarity.

References

Victor Gurney Logan Van Someren, 1970 Revisional notes on African Charaxes (Lepidoptera: Nymphalidae). Part VI. Bulletin of the British Museum (Natural History) (Entomology)197-250.

External links
Images of C. richelmanni ducarmei Royal Museum for Central Africa (Albertine Rift Project)
Images of C. richelmanni richelmanni (Albertine Rift Project)
 Charaxes richelmanni images at Consortium for the Barcode of Life includes verso
 Charaxes ducarmei  images at Consortium for the Barcode of Life

Butterflies described in 1936
richelmanni